Byrma is a rural locality (a settlement) in Palnikovskoye Rural Settlement, Permsky District, Perm Krai, Russia. The population was 153 as of 2010. There are 9  streets.

Geography 
Byrma is located 64 km south of Perm (the district's administrative centre) by road. Chelyaba is the nearest rural locality.

References 

Rural localities in Permsky District